Jermaine Wattimena (born 9 March 1988) is a Dutch darts player who competes in Professional Darts Corporation (PDC) tournaments.

Career

Wattimena won the first event he entered as he claimed the 2008 Malta Open by beating Vincent Busuttil in the final. He made his British Darts Organisation debut in a major event at the World Masters and won four games to reach the last 24 where he lost 3–0 to Steve Douglas. In 2014, Wattimena won the German Gold Cup courtesy of defeating Jan Dekker 3–2 in the final. Later in the year he qualified for the 2015 PDC World Championship by winning the Central European Qualifier, concluding with a 6–3 victory over Kenny Neyens. Wattimena entered the event in the preliminary round and narrowly lost 4–3 to Robert Marijanović, missing three match darts in the final leg.

He entered PDC Qualifying School in January 2015 and was eliminated in the final round of the third day by Steve Douglas. However, Wattimena had already done enough through the Order of Merit to not even need to play on the fourth day as he finished joint second on the Order of Merit to earn a two-year PDC tour card. He qualified for the UK Open and defeated Jonny Clayton 5–1 in the first round, but then lost 5–4 against Kevin McDine. Wattimena twice lost in the last 16 of Players Championship events during the year and beat Robert Marijanović 6–5 at the European Darts Grand Prix, but was then knocked out 6–3 by Peter Wright in the second round.

In the first round of the 2016 World Championship, Wattimena lost 3–1 to Mensur Suljović. He overcame Andy Smith 6–5 and Kevin Dowling 6–1 at the UK Open, before losing 9–7 to Alan Norris in the third round. At the 15th Players Championship wins over Jonny Clayton, David Pallett, Peter Wright, Simon Stevenson and Jelle Klaasen ensured Wattimena played in his first PDC semi-final and he was defeated 6–3 by Michael van Gerwen. He qualified for seven European Tour events during the season and, although he didn't get past the second round in any of them, his consistent play saw him make his debut in the European Championship, where he lost 6–1 to Mensur Suljović in the first round.

He lost 3–1 in the opening round of the World Championship for the second year in a row in the 2017 event, this time to Daryl Gurney. He knocked out Mick Todd, Dave Chisnall, Robert Thornton, Kyle Anderson and Benito van de Pas at the seventh Players Championship to reach his second PDC semi-final, where he was defeated 6–3 by Kim Huybrechts. He reached third PDC semi-final in Players Championships 17, where he beat Alan Tabern, Berry van Peer, Peter Hudson, Steve Beaton and Justin Pipe, before losing to Kevin Painter 6–3. He qualified for five European Tour events over 2017, failing to make it past the Last 32 in any of them, meaning he did not qualify for the European Championships. He made a third Players Championship semi-final of the year in the final weekend in Barnsley, where he knocked out Ross Twell, Ian White, Kevin Painter, Peter Jacques and Michael Smith, before a 6–2 defeat to Adrian Lewis. This was enough for him to qualify for the Players Championship Finals, as the 29th seed. Wattimena started off with a 6–0 hammering of Keegan Brown, where he averaged almost 97. He saw off Mickey Mansell 6–3 in the next round to move into his first major TV Last 16 appearance. Here, he was defeated 10–9 in a deciding leg by Steve Beaton after a superb comeback from 9–5 down. He picked up £8,000 here, his second biggest pay cheque of his career.

Wattimena's consistent improvement and progression up the rankings was rewarded with a 'challenger' spot for the 2020 Premier League in Rotterdam.

World Championship results

PDC
 2015: Preliminary round (lost to Robert Marijanović 3–4) (legs)
 2016: First round (lost to Mensur Suljović 1–3)
 2017: First round (lost to Daryl Gurney 1–3)
 2018: Second round (lost to Steve West 1–4)
 2019: Third round (lost to Gary Anderson 3–4)
 2020: Second round (lost to Luke Humphries 2–3)
 2021: Third round (lost to Dimitri Van den Bergh 0–4)
 2022: First round (lost to Boris Koltsov 0–3)
 2023: First round (lost to Nathan Rafferty 2–3)

Performance timeline 

BDO

PDC

PDC European Tour

References

External links

1988 births
Living people
Dutch darts players
British Darts Organisation players
Professional Darts Corporation current tour card holders
People from Westervoort
PDC World Cup of Darts Dutch team
Sportspeople from Gelderland